Qinghai Television  (QHTV)) is a television network under Hunan Broadcasting System (HBS) in the Xining city and Qinghai province area. It was founded on January 1, 1971. QHTV currently broadcasts in Chinese, Mongolian, Tibetan and Salar.

Programming
Kunlun Fight (2014)

External links
Official Site 

Television networks in China
Mass media in Xining
Television channels and stations established in 1971
1971 establishments in China
Hunan Broadcasting System